Roohaniyat ( Spirituality) (Hindi: रूहानियत) is an Indian, Hindi-Language Web Series directed by Glen Barretto & Ankush Mohla for MX Player Originals. The series stars Arjun Bijlani and Kanika Mann, Smita Bansal, Aman Yatan Verma in key roles and Yuvika Chaudhary as a special appearance. It is based on the Forever Series by Novoneel Chakraborty with new characters and additional storyline written by Shilpa Choubey and Sushil Choubey. The dialogues are penned by Shreyes Anil Lowlekar.

Summary
The series follows the story of Saveer Rathod, a man who has faced certain situations in his life that have lead him to believe that love does not last forever and a teen, Prisha Srivastava, who strongly believes in love. The two are complete strangers for each other, only till they are met again and again by coincidence, or destiny as Saveer believes it. Prisha somehow ends up playing a crucial role in Saveer's life and discovers something terrible about him that changes her life in a way she never could have expected.

Cast
Chapter 1
 Arjun Bijlani as Saveer Lekh Rathod
 Kanika Mann as Prisha Srivastava
 Yuvika Chaudhary as Ishanvi Purohit (Special Appearance)
 Aman Yatan Verma as Ashok Srivastava
 Smita Bansal as Priya Srivastava
 Arushi Handa as Pratha Srivastava (Shelly)
 Palak Purswani as Anita Malkani (Anu)
 Geetika Mehendru as Gouri Singh
 Harshit Sindhwani as Digambar Ahuja (Diggy)
 Shaan Groverr as Rishi Kulkarni
 Smittika Acharya as Neha Shinde (Sweety)
 Shikha Dogra as Dr. Mrudula
 Anuj Khurana as Sanjeev Kamath
 Karan Verma as Krishna
 Neetu Upadhyay as Shagufta
 Arjun Singh Shekhawat as Aarav
 Aishu Deora as Priyata Thomas
 Karanbir Arora as Jaggi
 Priya Parmar as Mrunal
 Prakhar Mishra as Prakhar
 Namrata Joshi as Kamla Rathod
 Bushra Shaikh as Zenia

Chapter 2 (Recurring)
 Arjun Bijlani as Veer Rathod/Saveera Rathod (Voice Over by Aleeza Khan)
 Manoj Chandlia as Aneesh Rebeiro
 Prajakta Parab as Patricia Rebeiro (Patty)
 Sameer Khandekar as Mukadam
 Saniya Dhawan as Dr. Nushrat

Overview

Episodes 
Chapter 1

Chapter 2

Soundtracks

References

External links 
 
 Roohaniyat on MX Player

2022 web series debuts
Indian drama web series
MX Player original programming
Serial drama television series
Indian drama television series
Indian thriller television series